National Freeway 10 is a freeway in Taiwan which begins in downtown Kaohsiung City at the intersection of Dajhong Road and Wunzih Road and ends in Cishan on the provincial highway 3.

Length
The total length is 33.8 km (21 miles).

Major cities along the route
Kaohsiung City

Exit List

Lanes
The lanes in each direction are listed below.
2 lanes:
Zuoying Terminus - Dingjin JCT.
Yanchao JCT. - Qishan Terminus.
3 lanes:
 Dingjin JCT. - Yanchao JCT.

See also
 Highway system in Taiwan

References

http://www.freeway.gov.tw/

freeway